Gem Township is a civil township in Bowman County in the U.S. state of North Dakota. As of the 2010 census, its population was 22.

References

External links
Map of Gem Township at Historic Map Works

Townships in Bowman County, North Dakota
Townships in North Dakota